Three-dimensional (3D) art may refer to:
 digital art created using 3D computer graphics
 any form of visual art resulting in a three-dimensional phyiscal object, such as sculpture, architecture, installation art and many decorative art forms
 two-dimensional art that creates the appearance of being in 3D, such as through stereoscopy, anamorphosis, or photorealism

See also 
 3D (disambiguation)